The Maryland Congressional elections of 2002 were held on Tuesday, November 5, 2002.  The terms of all eight Representatives to the United States House of Representatives expired on January 3, 2003, and therefore all were put up for contest. The winning candidates served a two-year term from January 3, 2003, to January 3, 2005.

Overview

District 1

District 2

District 3

District 4

District 5

District 6

District 7

District 8

References

See also

Maryland
2002
2002 Maryland elections